Sisile Khumalo (1880s), was Ndlovukati (Queen mother) of Swaziland during the reign of Dlamini IV.  Her son, Ludvonga, died without heirs and was never made king.

Khumalo was influential in the choice of Mbandzeni (later Dlamini IV) as successor to King Mswati II.

Khumalo was executed after quarrelling with Dlamini IV.

References

Swazi royalty
19th-century rulers in Africa
19th-century women rulers